WMD, or wmd, may refer to:

Science and technology 
 Weapon of mass destruction
 Weighted mean in statistics
 Wiggle-match-dating or wiggle matching in carbon dating
 World Meteorological Day

Transportation 
 WMD, the National Rail code for Wymondham railway station in Norfolk, UK
 WMD, the station code for Westmead railway station in Sydney, Australia

Other uses 
 West Midlands (county), metropolitan county in England, Chapman code
 wmd, the ISO 639-3 code for the Mamaindê language  spoken in the Mato Grosso state of Brazil
 World Malaria Day
 W.M.D., a 2017 film

See also